Roman Georgiyevich Grebennikov (born 25 August 1975 in Volgograd, USSR) is a Russian political figure and former Mayor of Volgograd. He was elected Mayor of Volgograd in 2007.

Biography 

Grebennikov graduated from law school at Volgograd State University in 1998. After graduation he worked as the head of a law firm. Grebennikov joined the Volgograd branch of the Communist Party of the Russian Federation, with the nomination of his candidacy for deputy supported by Alevtina Aparina. In 1998 and again in 2001, he was elected in the Volgograd Oblast Duma. From 2001 to 2005 he was chairman of the Volgograd Oblast Duma, becoming the youngest head of the legislative body in its history. In 2003, he moved to the Committee on Social Policy.

On 21 May 2007, Grebennikov was elected Mayor of Volgograd with 32.47% of the vote. He is the youngest mayor of a regional capital.

On 24 February 2011, Grebennikov was removed from his post of mayor of Volgograd after it was claimed he had several disputes with the governor of the province where his city is located.

References 

1975 births
Living people
Russian communists
Mayors of Volgograd
Communist Party of the Russian Federation members